The 2000 FIA GT Valencia 500 km was the first round the 2000 FIA GT Championship season.  It took place at the Circuit Ricardo Tormo, Spain, on March 26, 2000.

Official results
Class winners in bold.  Cars failing to complete 70% of winner's distance marked as Not Classified (NC).

Statistics
 Pole position – #14 Lister Storm Racing – 1:33.635
 Fastest lap – #14 Lister Storm Racing – 1:33.951
 Average speed – 143.350 km/h

References

 
 

Valencia
FIA GT
500km Valencia